This article presents a list of cities and towns in Bangladesh. According to the Bangladesh Bureau of Statistics and the Ministry of Local Government, Rural Development and Co-operatives of Bangladesh, there are 532 urban centres in Bangladesh.

The bureau defines an urban centre with a population of 100,000 or more as a "city". Altogether, there are 42 such cities in Bangladesh. 11 of these cities can be considered major cities as these are governed by City Corporations. All of the City Corporation-governed cities currently have a population of more than 200,000 (which is not a criterion for the status). Besides the 11 major cities, there are 31 other cities in Bangladesh that are not governed by "City Corporations", rather by "Municipal Corporations". A city with a population of more than 10,000,000 is defined by the bureau as a megacity. Dhaka is the only megacity in Bangladesh according to this definition. Together, Dhaka and the port city of Chittagong account for 48% of the country's urban population.

An urban centre with a population of less than 100,000 is defined as a "town". In total, there are 490 such towns in Bangladesh. Among these, 287 towns are governed by "Municipal Corporations". These are called "Paurashava"s in the local Bengali language. Altogether, including the ones governing 31 non-major cities, there are 318 Municipal Corporations.

In addition, there are another 203 towns which are Upazila centres (and other urban centres) and not governed by any Municipal Corporation or "Paurashava". These are the non-Municipal Corporation or "non-Paurashava" towns.

In 1951, Bangladesh was mostly a rural country and only 4% of the population lived in urban centres. The urban population rose to 20% in 1991 and to 24% by 2001. As of 2011, Bangladesh has an urban population of 28%. The rate of urban population growth is estimated at 2.8%. At this growth rate, Bangladesh's urban population will reach 79 million or 42% of the population by 2035. The urban centers of Bangladesh have a combined area of about 10600 square kilometers, which is 7% of the total area of Bangladesh. As such, Bangladesh has a very high urban population density: 4028 persons per square kilometer (2011), whereas the rural density is significantly lower: 790 persons per square kilometer (2011). The number of municipalities have tripled from 104 municipalities in 1991 to 318 municipalities in 2011.

Major cities
There are eleven major cities in Bangladesh that are governed by twelve city corporations, which include Dhaka North, Dhaka South, Chattogram, Khulna, Sylhet, Rajshahi, Mymensingh , Rangpur,Barishal Cumilla, Gazipur, and Narayanganj. Among these, Dhaka is a megacity, governed by two city corporations, and has a population of more than 10 million. It was formerly governed by the Dhaka City Corporation, until it was split into North and South in 2011. The populations of the cities are from the 2011 census.

Metropolitan areas
Eight of the aforementioned major cities are designated as metropolitan areas: Dhaka, Chittagong, Khulna, Sylhet, Rajshahi, Barisal, Rangpur and Gazipur. Metropolitan areas can be loosely defined as a major city combined with some of its adjacent municipalities and peri-urban areas.

Cities
In addition to the 11 major cities governed by City Corporations, there are 32 other cities which are governed by Municipal Corporations. These are given below in alphabetical order.

Source: 2011 Bangladesh census

Towns
The following is a list of towns in Bangladesh governed by Municipal Corporations.

Urban areas by population 

Dhaka is by far the largest urban area as well as the largest metropolitan area in Bangladesh. Chittagong is the second largest city and urban area in Bangladesh as well as the second largest metropolitan in Bangladesh.

Khulna is the third largest city and second largest port city of the country after Chittagong. Also, the adjoining areas of Khulna are abided by port-related business, industry, governmental foreign investment, and some well-known mega projects. This city also has a rich history of industrialization through the British period. Khulna has also a significant number of tourism industries centered on the largest mangrove forest of the world, the Sundarbans. Sylhet city is also the third developed city within Khulna and Rajshahi. Sylhet is also marked as an economically stronger city compared to other cities after Dhaka and Chittagong. Sylhet city also got a richer regional economy for remittances and the tourism industry. 
Rajshahi is also a big city and is known as the educational city of Bangladesh due to its well-marked educational institutions with better results and better educational performances.
So we can say that the best 5 cities in Bangladesh are Dhaka, Chittagong, Sylhet, Khulna, and Rajshahi. Other major cities with a stronger economy and developer infrastructure after these five best cities are Cumilla, Bogra, Rangpur, Tangail, Faridpur, Barishal, Gazipur, Narayanganj, Jessore, Kushtia, Patuakhali, Feni, Cox's Bazar, Mymenshing, Dinajpur, Pabna, Brahmanbaria, Narsingdi, Bholo, Gopalganj, Thakurgao, Chuadanga, Madaripur, etc.

The following table shows the largest populated area within a local government area.

See also
 List of city corporations in Bangladesh
 List of municipal corporations in Bangladesh
 List of villages in Bangladesh
 List of cities in Asia

References

External links 

 Principal cities and municipalities in Bangladesh
 International city telephone codes for Bangladesh
 Bangladesh postal codes
 List of Bangladesh cities
 The Paurashava Ordinance 1977

 
Lists of cities in Asia
 
 
Bangladesh
Cities